= Odostomia crassicosta =

Scientific classification
- Kingdom: Animalia
- Phylum: Mollusca
- Class: Gastropoda
- Family: Pyramidellidae
- Genus: Odostomia
- Species: O. crassicosta

Binomial name
- Odostomia crassicosta May, 1916

Synonyms
- Odostomia (Linopyrga) crassicosta May, 1916

Species of gastropod

Odostomia crassicosta, common name the thick-ribbed pyramid-shell, is a species of sea snail, a marine gastropod mollusk in the family Pyramidellidae, the pyrams and their allies.

== Description ==
The length of the shell measures 1.7 mm. The minute, white shell is solid, short, truncated and boldly ribbed. It contains three rounded whorls plus a smooth, inverted tip. The suture is deeply impressed, or channeled. About 20 strong rounded axial ribs cross the whorls, and bend over into the suture, and disappear on the base. They are separated by deep furrows of about equal width, which are crossed by numerous slightly raised lirae, which do not pass over the ribs, but continue on the base. The aperture is ovately pyriform, slightly expanded in front. The columella is curved, a little reflected over a narrow umbilicus, and bearing medially a very small, blunt tooth, which is quite invisible from a front view.

== Distribution ==
This endemic species occurs offshore off Tasmania
